Anemonoides trifolia (syn. Anemone trifolia), the three-leaved anemone, is a perennial herbaceous plant in buttercup family (Ranunculaceae).

Description
The plant has stems growing 10–30 cm tall and bear single, white (rarely pale pink or pale bluish) flowers two centimetres in diameter, with five to nine (most often six) elliptical tepals. The fruit is a cluster of 2 mm achenes. Its leaves are divided into three lanceolate leaflets and form a single whorl of three leaves per stem; the leaflets have a toothed but not lobed margin. The rhizome, found directly below surface is whitish, and tends to form dense clonal colonies. In subsp. albida, the achenes are pendulous. The flowering period extends from April through June.

The species differs from Anemonoides nemorosa in its white or pale blue anthers (unlike the yellow anthers of A. nemorosa) and simple lanceolate leaflets lacking the deep lobing of A. nemorosa.

Distribution
Anemonoides trifolia is very similar to Anemonoides nemorosa, but has a more restricted range in southern and central Europe, from Portugal and Spain east to Hungary, and locally north to Finland, where one small population occurs.

Habitat
It occurs in hardwood forests and rocky sites up to 1860 metres altitude.

Subspecies
The Portuguese and Spanish populations are distinguished as A. trifolia subsp. albida, with the remaining populations being A. trifolia subsp. trifolia.

References

trifolia
Flora of Europe
Plants described in 1753
Taxa named by Carl Linnaeus